The Cañon City Post Office and Federal Building in Cañon City, Colorado, was built in 1931.  It was listed on the National Register of Historic Places in 1986 as U.S. Post Office and Federal Building–Cañon City Main.  It has also been known as the Cañon City Main Post Office.

Architecturally, it is a rigidly symmetrical building that is "an extremely late example of Italian Renaissance Revival" style.  Its front facade features seven arches, one over the front entrance and the others over windows.

References

National Register of Historic Places in Fremont County, Colorado
Post office buildings on the National Register of Historic Places in Colorado
Renaissance Revival architecture in Colorado
Government buildings completed in 1931
Fremont County, Colorado